Pseudoeurycea saltator is a species of salamander in the family Plethodontidae. It is endemic to Oaxaca, Mexico, and only known from the northern slopes of the Sierra de Juarez above Vista Hermosa.

It is primarily an arboreal species living in bromeliads, but it can sometimes be found on the ground or under logs and bark. It is threatened by habitat loss caused by expanding agriculture and logging.

References

saltator
Endemic amphibians of Mexico
Fauna of the Sierra Madre de Oaxaca
Amphibians described in 1989
Taxa named by David B. Wake
Taxonomy articles created by Polbot